Calliteara abietis is a moth of the family Erebidae. It is found from northern and central Europe, through Russia to Japan.

The wingspan is 35–52 mm.

The larvae feed on Picea abies, Larix sibirica and Juniperus communis.

Subspecies
Calliteara abietis abietis
Calliteara abietis argentata (Japan,…)

External links
Image of Larva
Norwegian Lepidoptera
Moths and Butterflies of Europe and North Africa
Fauna Europaea

Lymantriinae
Moths of Europe
Moths of Asia
Moths described in 1775